Tankan (Quechua tanka a deep bifurcation, fork, -n a suffix, Hispanicized spelling Tancan) or Ruq'a Qaqa (Quechua ruq'a Opuntia floccosa), qaqa rock, Hispanicized Rucagaga) is a  mountain in the northern part of the Wallanka mountain range in the Andes of Peru. It is located in the Ancash Region, Bolognesi Province, in the districts of Aquia and Huallanca.

Sources 

Mountains of Peru
Mountains of Ancash Region